The 1937 Clemson Tigers football team was an American football team that represented Clemson College in the Southern Conference during the 1937 college football season. In their seventh season under head coach Jess Neely, the Tigers compiled a 4–4–1 record (2–0–1 against conference opponents), finished third in the conference, and outscored opponents by a total of 128 to 64.

Red Sharpe was the team captain. The team's statistical leaders included tailback Bob Bailey with 579 passing yards, fullback Don Willis with 329 rushing yards, and back Red Pearson with 29 points scored (3 touchdowns, 1 field goal, 8 extra points).

H.D. Lewis was the team captain. Two Clemson players were selected as first-team players on the 1937 All-Southern Conference football team: center Charlie Woods and tailback Bob Bailey.

Schedule

References

Clemson
Clemson Tigers football seasons
Clemson Tigers football